Louis Dalrymple (January 19, 1866 – December 28, 1905) was an American cartoonist, known for his caricatures in publications such as Puck, Judge, and the New York Daily Graphic. Born in Cambridge, Illinois, he studied at the Pennsylvania Academy of Fine Arts, and the Art Students League of New York, and in 1885 became the chief cartoonist of the Daily Graphic. 

His first wife was Letia Carpenter from Brooklyn. His second wife was Mary Ann Good. He died in 1905 of paresis in a New York sanitarium.

Gallery

References

External links

1866 births
1905 deaths
People from Cambridge, Illinois
Artists from Illinois
American caricaturists
American editorial cartoonists
Deaths from syphilis